Kilroy Was Here is the eleventh studio album by the American rock band Styx, released on February 22, 1983. A concept album and rock opera about a world where rock music is outlawed, it is named after a famous World War II graffiti tag, "Kilroy was here". It was the last album of original material to be released by the "classic" lineup of Dennis DeYoung, Tommy Shaw, James "J.Y." Young, John Panozzo, and Chuck Panozzo.

The album spawned two hit singles, the synth-pop "Mr. Roboto" which later became one of their signature songs, and the power ballad "Don't Let It End". Both of them were major hits in 1983, peaking at No. 3 and No. 6 respectively, on the US Billboard Hot 100.

The album is certified platinum by the RIAA. It is the most recent studio album by the band to be certified platinum.

In 2022, Rolling Stone named it one of the 50 Greatest Concept Albums of All Time.

Background
The band created the album Kilroy Was Here partly to mockingly respond to Christian groups and other anti-rock-music activists who had previously influenced the Arkansas State Senate to pass a bill requiring that all records containing backmasking be labeled as such by the manufacturer. Cited in the legislation were albums by The Beatles, Pink Floyd, Electric Light Orchestra, Queen, and Styx. ELO similarly responded with its own 1983 album Secret Messages.

The hard rocker "Heavy Metal Poisoning", the fifth track on the album, begins with the backmasked Latin words "annuit cœptis, novus ordo seclorum". Translated from the Latin, these words mean "[he] has favored our undertakings, a new order of the ages". These are the two mottoes from the Great Seal of the United States on the reverse side of the United States one-dollar bill.

The album's somewhat rock-operatic story tells of a future in which a fascist and theocratic government and the "MMM (the Majority for Musical Morality)" have outlawed rock music. The story's protagonist, Robert Orin Charles Kilroy (DeYoung), is a former rock star who has been imprisoned by MMM leader Dr. Everett Righteous (Young). He escapes using a disguise (according to the album's famous song "Mr. Roboto") when he becomes aware that a young musician, Jonathan Chance (Shaw), is on a mission to bring rock music back.

Vocalist and keyboardist Dennis DeYoung conceived Kilroy Was Here as an album and accompanying stage show, which opened with a short film of the same name. According to the episode of Behind the Music featuring Styx, the early part of the supporting tour was a financial disaster, due to the fact that Styx had booked small, theater-sized venues for a more intimate experience, while later tour dates saw the group performing in large arenas to sold-out crowds. The album debuted at No. 10 on the Billboard 200 in its first week and sold over 1 million copies (although some sources say 2.5 million copies) and peaked at No. 3 on the US charts; however, it broke the streak of multi-platinum albums for Styx, and ushered in a more keyboard-oriented, theatrical direction although at the time the band enjoyed making the album.

In an interview with the Chicago Tribune, James Young talked about the creative differences in the band, and what led to their breakup: "Dennis really wanted to do these soft, intimate love ballads, and that was against the grain for me and Tommy Shaw, so our differences got magnified, because Dennis was insisting on going outside the boundaries we lived with. He's an assertive and strongly opinionated guy." 

Dennis, on the other hand, cited in a 2018 interview on Rock Talk With Mitch Lafon and another interview with Sea Of Tranquility that Tommy's drug and alcohol addictions were why he abruptly left the band on stage at a show at the Capital Center in Largo, MD which stopped momentum and stalled the tour. Then Tommy was talked back into finishing the tour and Tommy's official 1984 departure caused Styx to go on hiatus scrapping a planned 1984 stadium tour which would have seen the band record a live album (the Kilroy Tour would be the source for Caught in the Act released in Spring 1984). When Tommy quit, the Panozzos and JY were angry and wanted to replace Tommy whereas Dennis refused to replace Tommy and he decided to put the band on hiatus until Tommy was ready to return and both Tommy and Dennis made solo albums in the next few years as A&M had stated in contract that they were allowed to make solo albums (JY would also make solo projects).

Despite the album's financial and chart success, after the Kilroy tour, the songs were not performed live by the band Styx (who fired DeYoung in 1999) in subsequent tours (with the exception of segments from "Mr. Roboto" and "Heavy Metal Poisoning" performed in the "Cyclo-medley"), until "Mr. Roboto" reappeared in full (in their encore) on May 30, 2018. DeYoung does perform the songs "Mr. Roboto" and "Don't Let It End" regularly during his solo tours. The James Young Group performed "Heavy Metal Poisoning" and "Double Life" as well on their tour in 1993.

Music video
Three of the four videos for the album—"Mr. Roboto", "Don't Let It End", and "Heavy Metal Poisoning"—were filmed at the same time and used footage from the minifilm. A fourth video, "Haven't We Been Here Before", was filmed a few months after the album was released; it did not interact with the album's story.

Track listing

Personnel

Styx
 Dennis DeYoung – vocals, keyboards
 James "JY" Young – vocals, electric guitars
 Tommy Shaw – vocals, electric and acoustic guitars, shamisen, vocoder
 Chuck Panozzo – bass guitar
 John Panozzo – drums, percussion

Additional personnel
 Steve Eisen – saxophone
 Dan Barber – horn
 Mike Halpin – horn
 Michael Mossman – horn
 Mark Ohlson – horn

Production
 Arranged & produced by Styx
 Engineers: Gary Loizzo, Will Rascati, Rob Kingsland
 Apprentice engineer: Jim Popko
 Mastering by Ted Jensen at Sterling Sound, NYC

Charts

Weekly charts

Year-end charts

Certifications and sales

References

External links 
 Styx - Kilroy Was Here (1983) album review by Mike DeGagne, credits & releases at AllMusic.com
 Styx - Kilroy Was Here (1983) album releases & credits at Discogs.com
 Styx - Kilroy Was Here (1983) album to be listened as stream at Spotify.com

1983 albums
Rock operas
Science fiction concept albums
A&M Records albums
Styx (band) albums
Dystopian music